The Kewaunee Marshland Walk is a wooden boardwalk through the Kewaunee River marsh. The boardwalk is 980 feet long. It was built in 1993 as a cooperative effort between the City of Kewaunee and the Wisconsin Coastal Management Program.

References

Hiking trails in Wisconsin
Tourist attractions in Kewaunee County, Wisconsin